Selloa is a genus of Latin American plants in the tribe Millerieae within the family Asteraceae.

 Species

 formerly included
see Acmella Aphanactis Flaveria Gymnosperma

References

Millerieae
Asteraceae genera